|}

The Fortune Stakes is a Listed flat horse race in Great Britain open to horses aged three years or older. It is run at Sandown Park over a distance of 1 mile (1,609 metres), and it is scheduled to take place each year in September.

The race was run at Kempton Park until 1996, at Epsom between 1997 and 2007 and at Haydock Park in 2008.

The current name was adopted in 1991, the race previously being known as the Glint of Gold Stakes.

The race held Listed status until 1996 and this was reinstated in 2003.

Winners since 1988

See also
 Horse racing in Great Britain
 List of British flat horse races

References
 Racing Post:

Flat races in Great Britain
Sandown Park Racecourse
Open mile category horse races